The Embassy of Lebanon in Ottawa is Lebanon's embassy in Canada. It is located at 640 Lyon Street in Ottawa, the Canadian capital.

Lebanon also operates a Canadian consulate office in Montreal and appoints honorary consuls in Halifax.

External links

Embassy of Lebanon in Ottawa
 , Department of Foreign Affairs and International Trade (Canada), August 2007

Lebanon
Ottawa
Canada–Lebanon relations